Yefim Dmitriyevich Boytsov (born 22 June 1999) is a Russian football player.

Club career
He made his debut in the Russian Football National League for FC Akron Tolyatti on 3 April 2021 in a game against FC Tom Tomsk.

References

External links
 Profile by Russian Football National League
 

1999 births
Footballers from Saint Petersburg
Living people
Russian footballers
Association football midfielders
FC Zenit Saint Petersburg players
FC Khimki players
FC Irtysh Omsk players
FC Akron Tolyatti players
Russian First League players
Russian Second League players